Gardiner Township is a geographic township in the Unorganized North Part of Cochrane District, Ontario, Canada.

The township is the location of the mouths of Pickett Creek and the Gardiner River at the Mattagami River, and the confluence of the Mattagami River and the Missinaibi River that forms the Moose River, a river that flows to James Bay. 

References

Other map sources:

Geographic townships in Ontario
Geography of Cochrane District